Albaye Papa Diop (born 12 December 1984) is a Senegalese football player who currently plays .

Career
He has previously played for Dinamo București in Romania and FC Aarau in Switzerland at youth level but never managed to make it into their first teams. He signed for Dinamo Tirana in the summer of 2005. Since joining the Tirana club he has established himself in the first team and become one of the best foreign players to have ever played in Albania. Papa Diop has played over 100 league games and scored 8 goals for the Albanian club and he also played a key role in Dinamo's title winning season of 2007–2008. He has played for Dinamo Tirana in the UEFA Intertoto Cup, UEFA Cup and UEFA Champions League. He is currently playing for Al Faysaly in Saudi Premier League.

International career 
Because Papa Diop has not yet featured for Senegal he is still eligible to play for another international team. Josip Kuže, the coach of Albania expressed his desire to have the Senegalese defensive midfielder in his team for the upcoming Euro 2012 qualifiers.

Honours

Jeanne d'Arc
CAF Champions League Semi finalist (1): 2004

Dinamo Tirana
Albanian Superliga (2): 2007–08, 2009–10
Albanian Supercup (1): 2008

References

1979 births
Living people
Senegalese footballers
Association football defenders
Senegalese expatriate footballers
Expatriate footballers in Switzerland
FC Aarau players
Senegalese expatriate sportspeople in Switzerland
Expatriate footballers in Albania
FK Dinamo Tirana players
KS Shkumbini Peqin players
Senegalese expatriate sportspeople in Albania
Expatriate footballers in Saudi Arabia
Al-Faisaly FC players
Al Batin FC players
Al-Qaisumah FC players
Saudi Professional League players
Saudi First Division League players
Senegalese expatriate sportspeople in Saudi Arabia